Tournaments include international (FIBA), professional (club) and amateur and collegiate levels.

National tournaments

FIBA Basketball World Cup qualifiers
 1–11 August: 2013 FIBA Asia Championship for Men in Metro Manila, Philippines:
 
 
 
 14–18 August: 2013 FIBA Oceania Championship for Men in Auckland, New Zealand and Canberra, Australia:
 
 
 20–31 August: 2013 FIBA Africa Championship for Men in Abidjan, Ivory Coast:
 
 
 
 30 August – 11 September: 2013 FIBA Americas Championship for Men in Caracas, Venezuela:
 
 
 
4th: 
 4–22 September: FIBA EuroBasket 2013 in Slovenia:
 
 
 
4th: 
5th: 
6th: 
7th:

FIBA World Championship for Women qualifiers
 15–30 June: EuroBasket Women 2013 in France:

 14–18 August: 2013 FIBA Oceania Championship for Women in Auckland, New Zealand and Canberra, Australia:

 20–29 September: 2013 FIBA Africa Championship for Women in Maputo, Mozambique:

 21–28 September: 2013 FIBA Americas Championship for Women in Xalapa and Veracruz, Mexico:

 27 October–3 November: FIBA Asia Championship for Women in Bangkok, Thailand

Other tournaments
28 May–1 June: Games of the Small States of Europe in D'Coque, Luxembourg:
Men's tournament:

Women's tournament:

18–25 June: Mediterranean Games in Mersin, Turkey:

2013 William Jones Cup in Taipei City, Taiwan
6–15 July: Men's tournament:

15–20 September: Islamic Solidarity Games in Palembang, Indonesia:
Men's tournament:

Women's tournament:

8–16 December: Southeast Asian Games in Naypidaw, Myanmar
Men's tournament:

Women's tournament:

Youth tournaments

2014 FIBA Under-17 World championship qualifiers
 11–15 June: 2013 FIBA Americas Under-16 Championship for Men in Punta de Este, Uruguay:

 28 June–7 July: 2013 FIBA Africa Under-16 Championship for Men in Antananarivo, Madagascar:

 8–18 August: 2013 FIBA Europe Under-16 Championship for Men in Sarajevo, Bosnia and Herzegovina:

 25 September–4 October: 2013 FIBA Asia Under-16 Championship for Men in Tehran, Iran:

 26–28 September: 2013 FIBA Oceania Under-16 Championship for Men in Melbourne, Australia:

2014 FIBA Under-17 World Championship for Women qualifiers
 19–23 June: 2013 FIBA Americas Under-16 Championship for Women in Cancún, Mexico:

 1–11 August: 2013 FIBA Europe Under-16 Championship for Women in Varna and Albena, Bulgaria:

 26–28 September: 2013 FIBA Oceania Under-16 Championship for Women in Melbourne, Australia:

 5–12 October: 2013 FIBA Africa Under-16 Championship for Women in Maputo, Mozambique:

 23–30 November: 2013 FIBA Asia Under-16 Championship for Women in Colombo, Sri Lanka:

2013 FIBA Europe youth championships
 8–18 August: U-16 European Championship Men Division A in  Kyiv
 8–18 August: U-16 European Championship Men Division B in  Sarajevo
 2–7 July: U-16 European Championship Men Division C in  Gibraltar
 18–28 July: U-18 European Championship Men Division A in  Liepāja, Ventspils and Riga
 18–28 July: U-18 European Championship Men Division B in  Strumica
 15–20 July: U-18 European Championship Men Division C in  Andorra la Vella
 9–21 July: U-20 European Championship Men Division A in  Tallinn
 12–21 July: U-20 European Championship Men Division B in  Pitești
 1–11 August: U-16 European Championship Women Division A in  Varna and Albena
 1–11 August: U-16 European Championship Women Division B in  Matosinhos
 2–7 July: U-16 European Championship Women Division C in  Gibraltar
 15–25 August: U-18 European Championship Women Division A in  Vukovar and Vinkovci
 15–25 August: U-18 European Championship Women Division B in  Miskolc
 15–20 July: U-18 European Championship Women Division C in  Andorra la Vella
 4–14 July: U-20 European Championship Women Division A in  Samsun
 4–14 July: U-20 European Championship Women Division B in  Albena

Club championships

Continental championships
Men:
FIBA Intercontinental Cup:
  Olympiacos   EC Pinheiros 
Euroleague:
  Olympiacos   Real Madrid   CSKA Moscow
Euroleague MVP and Euroleague Final Four MVP:  Vassilis Spanoulis, Olympiacos
Alphonso Ford Trophy (season's leading scorer):  Bobby Brown,  Montepaschi Siena
Eurocup:
  Lokomotiv-Kuban   Uxue Bilbao Basket   Budivelnyk Kyiv,  Valencia
EuroChallenge:
  Krasnye Krylia Samara   Pınar Karşıyaka   EWE Baskets Oldenburg
FIBA Americas League:
  EC Pinheiros    Lanús   Capitanes de Arecibo
 FIBA Asia Champions Cup:
  Foolad Mahan Isfahan   Al Rayyan   ASU
Women:
EuroLeague Women:
  UMMC Ekaterinburg   Fenerbahçe   Bourges Basket

Transnational championships
Men:
 NBA
Season:
 Division champions: New York Knicks (Atlantic), Indiana Pacers (Central), Miami Heat (Southeast), Oklahoma City Thunder (Northwest), Los Angeles Clippers (Pacific), San Antonio Spurs (Southwest)
 Best regular-season record: Miami Heat (66–16)
 Eastern Conference: Miami Heat
 Western Conference: San Antonio Spurs
 Finals: The Heat defend their title from last season, defeating the Spurs 4–3 in the best-of-7 series. LeBron James repeats as Finals MVP.
  National Basketball League, 2012–13 season:
 Premiers: New Zealand Breakers
 Champions: The Breakers win their third straight championship, sweeping the Perth Wildcats 2–0 in the best-of-3 Grand Final.
Adriatic League, 2012–13:  Partizan Belgrade defeat  Red Star Belgrade 71–63 in the one-off final.
ASEAN Basketball League, 2013:  San Miguel Beermen sweep the Indonesia Warriors 3–0 in the best-of-5 finals.
Balkan League, 2012–13:  Hapoel Gilboa Galil defeat  Levski Sofia 87-79 in the one-off final.
Baltic League:  Ventspils defeat  Prienai 161–150 on aggregate (91–69, 70–71) in the two-legged final.
Czech League:  Nymburk sweep  Prostějov 4–0 in the best-of-7 final. This is Nymburk's 10th straight league title.
VTB United League, 2012–13:  CSKA Moscow defeat  Lokomotiv-Kuban 3–1 in the best-of-5 final.

National championships
 Liga Nacional de Básquet, 2012–13:
 Regular season championship Round: Regatas
 Playoffs: Regatas sweep the Lanús 4-0 in the best-of-7 final.
 Austrian Bundesliga: BC Vienna defeat Oberwart Gunners 3–2 in the best-of-5 finals. 
 Belaruisan Premier League:BC Tsmoki-Minsk sweep BK Grodno-93 3–0 in the best-of-5 finals. 
 Basketball League Belgium, 2012–13: Telenet Oostende sweep Belfius Mons-Hainaut 3–0 in the best-of-5 finals.
 Bosnia and Herzegovina Championship, 2012–13: KK Igokea defeat Široki WWin 3–2 in the best-of-5 finals. 
 Novo Basquete Brasil, 2012–13: Flamengo defeat Uberlândia 77–70 in the final.
 Bulgarian National League: Lukoil Academic defeat Levski Sofia 3–2 in the best-of-5 final, claiming their 11th straight league title.
 Chinese Basketball Association:
 Regular season: Guangdong Southern Tigers 
 Playoffs: Guangdong Southern Tigers sweep the Shandong Lions 4–0 in the best-of-7 final. 
 Croatian League, 2012–13: Cibona sweep Zadar 3–0 in the best-of-5 final.
 Dutch Basketball League, 2012–13: ZZ Leiden sweep Aris Leeuwarden 4–0 in the best-of-7 final.
 Estonian League, 2012–13: Kalev/Cramo sweep TÜ/Rock 4–0 in the best-of-7 final.
 French Pro A League, 2012–13: Nanterre defeat Strasbourg 3–1 in the best-of-5 final.
 German Bundesliga, 2012–13: Brose Baskets sweep EWE Baskets Oldenburg 3–0 in the best-of-5 final, claiming their fourth consecutive title.
 Greek League, 2012–13: Panathinaikos sweep Olympiacos 3–0 in the best-of-5 final.
 National Basketball League (Indonesia), 2012–13: Dell Aspac defeat Pelita Jaya Esia 63-50 in the one-off final.
 Iranian Super League, 2012–13: Petrochimi defeat Mahram 3-2 in the best-of-5 final.
 Israeli Super League, 2012–13: Maccabi Haifa defeat Maccabi Tel Aviv 86–79 in the one-off final.
 Italian Serie A, 2012–13: Montepaschi Siena defeat Acea Roma 4–1 in the best-of-7 final, claiming their seventh straight title.
 Japan Basketball League, 2012–13: Toshiba Brave Thunders defeat the Aishin Sea Horses 3-2 in the best-of-5 final.
 Korean Basketball League, 2012–13: Ulsan Mobis Phoebus sweep the Seoul SK Knights 4-0 in the best-of-7 final.
 Latvian League, 2012–13: VEF Rīga defeat Ventspils 4–1 in the best-of-7 final.
 Lithuanian LKL, 2012–13: Žalgiris sweep Lietuvos rytas 4–0 in the best-of-7 final.
 Mexican League, 2012–13: Toros de Los Dos Laredos defeat Halcones UV Xalapa 4–2 in the best-of-7 final.
 Montenegro League: Budućnost sweep the Sutjeska 3-0 in the best-of-5 final.
 Philippine Basketball Association, 2012–13:
Philippine Cup:  The Talk 'N Text Tropang Texters sweep the Rain or Shine Elasto Painters 4–0 in the best-of-7 finals.
Commissioner's Cup:  The Alaska Aces sweep Barangay Ginebra San Miguel 3–0 in the best-of-5 finals.
Governors' Cup: The San Mig Coffee Mixers defeat the Petron Blaze Boosters 4–3 in the best-of-7 finals. 
 Polish League, 2012–13: Stelemet Zielona Góra sweep PGE Turów 4–0 in the best-of-7 final.
 Portuguese League: Benfica defeat Académica de Coimbra 3-1 in the best-of-5 final.
 Divizia A: CSU Asesoft Ploiești defeat Mureș 4–2 in the best-of-7 final.
 Russian PBL, 2012–13: CSKA Moscow (regular-season play only; no playoffs)
 League of Serbia, 2012–13: Partizan Belgrade defeat Red Star Belgrade 3–1 in the best-of-5 final.
 Slovenian League: Krka Novo Mesto defeat Union Olimpija Ljubljana i3–1 n the best-of-5 final.
 Spanish ACB:
Season: Real Madrid
Playoffs: Real Madrid defeat FC Barcelona Regal 3–2 in the best-of-5 final.
 Super Basketball League: Pure Youth defeat Dacin Tigers
 Turkish League, 2012–13: Galatasaray Medical Park defeat Banvit 4–1 in the best-of-7 final.
 Ukrainian SuperLeague, 2012–13: Budivelnyk Kyiv defeat Azovmash Mariupol 4–3 in the best-of-7 final.
 British Basketball League, 2012–13:
Season: Leicester Riders
Playoffs: The Riders defeat the Newcastle Eagles 68–57 in the one-off final.

Women:
 WNBA
Season:
 Eastern Conference: Atlanta Dream
 Western Conference: Minnesota Lynx
 Finals: The Lynx sweep the Dream 3–0 in the best-of-5 series, claiming their second title in three years. Maya Moore of the Lynx in named Finals MVP.

College seasons: Men's Division

Women
 NCAA
Division I: Connecticut 93, Louisville 60
 Most Outstanding Player: Breanna Stewart, Connecticut
WNIT: Drexel 46, Utah 43
Women's Basketball Invitational: Detroit 73, McNeese State 62
Division II: Ashland 71, Dowling 56
Division III: DePauw 69, Wisconsin–Whitewater 51
 NAIA
NAIA Division I: Westmont College 71, Lee University 65
NAIA Division II: Indiana Wesleyan 61, Davenport 43
 NJCAA
Division I: Trinity Valley 83, Central Arizona 71
Division II: Louisburg 75, Mesa 65
Division III: Rock Valley 78, Mohawk Valley 60
 UAAP Women's: La Salle defeated NU 2–1 in the best-of-3 finals.

Prep
 USA Today Boys Basketball Ranking #1:
 USA Today Girls Basketball Ranking #1:
 NCAA (Philippines) Juniors: San Beda defeated LSGH in 2 games in the finals en route to winning all 20 games of the season.
 UAAP Juniors: NU defeated Ateneo in 2 games in the finals en route to winning all 18 games of the season.

Awards and honors

Naismith Memorial Basketball Hall of Fame
Class of 2013:
Players: Roger Brown, Richie Guerin, Bernard King, Gary Payton, Oscar Schmidt, Dawn Staley
Coaches: Sylvia Hatchell, Guy Lewis, Rick Pitino, Jerry Tarkanian
Contributors: Russ Granik, Edwin Bancroft Henderson

Women's Basketball Hall of Fame
Class of 2012
 Gary Blair
 Jim Foster
 Peggie Gillom-Granderson
 Jennifer Rizzotti
 Annette Smith-Knight
 Sue Wicks

FIBA Hall of Fame
Class of 2013:
Players: Jean-Jacques Conceiçao, Teresa Edwards, Andrew Gaze, Paula Gonçalves, David Robinson, Zoran Slavnić
Coaches: Jack Donohue, Cesare Rubini, Pat Summitt
Technical officials: Valentin Lazarov, Costas Rigas
Contributors: Aldo Vitale

Professional
Men
NBA Most Valuable Player Award: LeBron James, Miami Heat
NBA Rookie of the Year Award: Damian Lillard, Portland Trail Blazers
NBA Defensive Player of the Year Award: Marc Gasol, Memphis Grizzlies
NBA Sixth Man of the Year Award: J. R. Smith, New York Knicks
NBA Most Improved Player Award: Paul George, Indiana Pacers
NBA Sportsmanship Award: Jason Kidd, New York Knicks
NBA Coach of the Year Award: George Karl, Denver Nuggets
J. Walter Kennedy Citizenship Award: Kenneth Faried, Denver Nuggets
Twyman–Stokes Teammate of the Year Award: Chauncey Billups, Los Angeles Clippers
NBA Executive of the Year Award: Masai Ujiri, Denver Nuggets
FIBA Europe Player of the Year Award: 
Euroscar Award:
Mr. Europa:
Women
WNBA Most Valuable Player Award: Candace Parker, Los Angeles Sparks
WNBA Defensive Player of the Year Award: Tamika Catchings, Indiana Fever
WNBA Rookie of the Year Award: Elena Delle Donne, Chicago Sky
WNBA Sixth Woman of the Year Award: Sylvia Fowles, Chicago Sky
WNBA Most Improved Player Award: Shavonte Zellous, Indiana Fever
Kim Perrot Sportsmanship Award: Swin Cash, Chicago Sky & Tamika Catchings, Indiana Fever
WNBA Coach of the Year Award: Mike Thibault, Washington Mystics
WNBA All-Star Game MVP: Candace Parker, Los Angeles Sparks
FIBA Europe Player of the Year Award
WNBA Finals Most Valuable Player Award: Maya Moore, Minnesota Lynx

Collegiate 
 Combined
Legends of Coaching Award: Bill Self, Kansas
 Men
John R. Wooden Award: Trey Burke, Michigan
Naismith College Coach of the Year: Jim Larrañaga, Miami (FL)
Frances Pomeroy Naismith Award: Peyton Siva, Louisville
Associated Press College Basketball Player of the Year: Trey Burke, Michigan
NCAA basketball tournament Most Outstanding Player: Shabazz Napier, Connecticut
USBWA National Freshman of the Year: Marcus Smart, Oklahoma State
Associated Press College Basketball Coach of the Year: Jim Larrañaga, Miami
Naismith Outstanding Contribution to Basketball: Lute Olson
 Women
John R. Wooden Award: Brittney Griner, Baylor
Naismith College Player of the Year: Brittney Griner, Baylor
Naismith College Coach of the Year: Muffet McGraw, Notre Dame
Wade Trophy: Brittney Griner, Baylor
Frances Pomeroy Naismith Award: Alex Bentley, Penn State
Associated Press Women's College Basketball Player of the Year: Brittney Griner, Baylor
NCAA basketball tournament Most Outstanding Player: Breanna Stewart, UConn
Basketball Academic All-America Team: Elena Delle Donne, Delaware
Kay Yow Award: Sue Semrau, Florida State
Carol Eckman Award: Jan Ross, Oklahoma
Maggie Dixon Award: Holly Warlick, Tennessee
USBWA National Freshman of the Year: Jewell Loyd, Notre Dame
Associated Press College Basketball Coach of the Year: Muffet McGraw, Notre Dame
List of Senior CLASS Award women's basketball winners: Elena Delle Donne, Delaware
Nancy Lieberman Award: Skylar Diggins, Notre Dame
Naismith Outstanding Contribution to Basketball: Pat Summitt

Events
 April 15 – The 2013 WNBA draft is held at the ESPN studios in Bristol, Connecticut, with Baylor center Brittney Griner chosen first overall.
 April 29 – After Sacramento mayor and former NBA player Kevin Johnson recruits an ownership group to make a counter-offer to keep the Kings in Sacramento, a league committee unanimously recommends that owners reject the Seattle group's deal.
 May 31 – The sale of the Kings to the Sacramento-based group led by Vivek Ranadive is closed.
 June 27 – The 2013 NBA draft is held at the Barclays Center in Brooklyn, with Anthony Bennett, a power forward from UNLV, becoming the first Canadian to be chosen as the first overall pick.
 December 6 – In the highest-scoring game in NCAA Division I women's history, Kentucky defeats Baylor 133–130 in four overtimes. The game, held at AT&T Stadium in Arlington, Texas, was the front end of a doubleheader that included the two schools' men's teams.

Movies
Long Shot: The Kevin Laue Story
Medora

Deaths
January 7 — Gonzalo Puyat II, former president of FIBA (born 1934)
 January 10 — Jay Handlan, College All-American (Washington and Lee) and AAU player (born 1928)
 January 12 — Chuck Dalton, Canadian Olympic player (1952) (born 1927)
 January 15 — George Gund III, NBA owner (Cleveland Cavaliers) (born 1937)
 January 16 — Wayne D. Anderson, American college coach (Idaho) (born 1930)
 January 19 — Jim Marking, American college coach (South Dakota State) (born 1927)
 January 24 — Jim Line, two-time NCAA championship player at Kentucky (1948, 1949) (born 1926)
 January 31 — Larry Killick, 10th overall selection in the 1947 BAA draft (born 1922)
 February 3 — B. H. Born, 1953 NCAA Tournament Most Outstanding Player (Kansas), AAU player (born 1932)
 February 7 — Howard Lassoff, American player (Maccabi Tel Aviv) (born 1955)
 February 11 — Jim Boatwright, American player (Maccabi Tel Aviv) (born 1951)
 February 11 — Matthew White, American player known for his collegiate career (University of Pennsylvania) (born 1957)
 February 13 — Harry Miller, 86, American college coach (Fresno State, Eastern New Mexico, Wichita State, Stephen F. Austin).
 February 13 — Tibor Zsíros, Hungarian Olympic player (1948, 1952) (born 1930)
 February 17 — Phil Henderson, three-time Final Four player at Duke (born 1968)
 February 18 — Jerry Buss, Los Angeles Lakers owner and member of the Naismith Memorial Basketball Hall of Fame (born 1933)
 March 2 — Giorgos Kolokithas, Greek player (Panathinaikos B.C.) (born 1945)
 March 3 — Bart Quinn, American NBL player (Fort Wayne General Electrics) (born 1917)
 March 3 — George Wearring, Canadian Olympic player (1952) (born 1928)
 March 4 — Chick Halbert, American BBA player (born 1919)
 March 5 — Calvin Fowler, ABA player (Carolina Cougars) and 1968 Olympic Gold Medalist (born 1940)
 March 7 — Harold Hunter, College coach (NC Central), first African-American to sign an NBA contract (born 1926)
 March 8 — Mickey Marty, 91, All-American college player (Loras).
 March 14 — Jack Curran, American high school coach (Archbishop Molloy High School) (born 1930)
 March 22 — Ray Williams, NBA player (New York Knicks, among others) (born 1954)
 March 26 — Tom Boerwinkle, NBA player (Chicago Bulls) (born 1945)
 March 30 — Bob Nichols, 82, American college coach (Toledo).
 March 30 — Bobby Parks, American player (San Miguel, Shell, Aspac Jakarta) (born 1962)
 April 1 — Greg Willard, NBA referee (born 1958)
 April 7 — Marty Blake, NBA GM (Atlanta Hawks and scout (born 1927)
 April 12 — Marv Harshman, Naismith Hall of Fame college coach (Washington State, Washington) (born 1917)
 April 24 — Murray Satterfield, 87, American college coach (Boise State, College of Idaho)
 May 5 — Jack Turner, NBA player (Chicago Packers) (born 1939)
 May 16 — Carl Bennett, NBA coach and GM (Fort Wayne Pistons) (born 1915)
 May 23 — Flynn Robinson, NBA player (born 1941)
 May 29 — Cliff Meely, NBA player (Houston Rockets, Los Angeles Lakers) (born 1947)
 June 4 — Monti Davis, NBA player (Philadelphia 76ers, Dallas Mavericks) (born 1958)
 June 7 — Charlie Coles, College coach (Central Michigan, Miami of Ohio) (born 1942)
 June 19 — Ólafur Rafnsson, Icelandic president of FIBA Europe (born 1963)
 July 6 — Rudy Keeling, College coach (Maine, Northeastern) (born 1947)
 July 6 — Leland Mitchell, ABA player (New Orleans Buccaneers) (born 1941)
 July 14 — Simmie Hill, ABA player (born 1946)
 July 23 — Red McManus, college coach (Creighton) (born 1925)
 July 30 — Ossie Schectman, BAA player (New York Knicks) (born 1919)
 August 2 — George Hauptfuhrer, third overall pick in the 1948 BAA draft (born 1926)
 August 5 — Roy Rubin, NBA (Philadelphia 76ers) and college (Long Island) coach (born 1925)
 August 14 — Jack Garfinkel, BAA player (Boston Celtics) (born 1918)
 August 17 — Devin Gray, NBA player (Sacramento Kings, San Antonio Spurs, Houston Rockets) (born 1972)
 August 23 — Dean Meminger, NBA player (New York Knicks) (born 1948)
 August 30 — Howie Crittenden, college (Murray State) and AAU (Peoria Cats) player (born 1933)
 September 3 — Don Meineke, NBA player (Fort Wayne Pistons, Cincinnati Royals) (born 1930)
 September 7 — Zelmo Beaty, NBA/ABA player (St. Louis Hawks, Utah Stars, Los Angeles Lakers) (born 1939)
 September 16 — Jim Palmer, NBA player (Cincinnati Royals, New York Knicks) (born 1933)
 September 17 — Dick O'Neal, All-American college player (TCU) (born 1935)
 September 29 — Bob Kurland, Hall of Fame college (Oklahoma State) and AAU (Phillips 66ers) player (born 1924)
 October 3 — Sergei Belov, Russian Olympic gold medalist (1972) (born 1944)
 October 13 — Joe Meriweather, NBA player (Kansas City Kings, among others) (born 1953)
 October 23 — Wes Bialosuknia, ABA player (Oakland Oaks) (born 1945)
 October 25 — Bill Sharman, Hall of Fame player and coach (born 1926)
 October 25 — Chico Vaughn, NBA and ABA player (St. Louis Hawks, Detroit Pistons, Pittsburgh Pipers) (born 1940)
 November 2 — Walt Bellamy, Hall of Fame player and 1960 Olympic Gold medalist (born 1939)
 November 7 — Ian Davies, Australian player (Sydney Kings) and Olympian (born 1956)
 November 7 — Lenny Rzeszewski, American college basketball player (Indiana State) (born 1923)
 November 17 — Joe Dean, Collegiate basketball Hall of Fame player, administrator (LSU) (born 1930)
 November 21 — Vern Mikkelsen, Hall of Fame player (Minneapolis Lakers) (born 1928)
 November 29 — Valdis Muižnieks, Latvian player who won three Olympic silver medals as a part of the Soviet Union national team (born 1935)
 December 6 — M. K. Turk, college coach (Southern Miss) (born 1942)
 December 15 — Dyron Nix, NBA player (Indiana Pacers) (born 1967)
 December 18 — Harry Boland, Irish Olympic player (born 1925)
 December 29 — Connie Dierking, NBA player (Cincinnati Royals, Philadelphia 76ers) (born 1936)
 December 29 — Khushi Ram, Indian player (born 1936)
 December 31 — Johnny Orr, NBA player and college coach (Michigan, Iowa State) (born 1927)
 December 31 — Art Stolkey, BAA player (Detroit Falcons) (born 1920)

See also
 Timeline of women's basketball

References

External links